The 2010–11 Umaglesi Liga was the 22nd season of top-tier football in Georgia. It began on 14 August 2010 and ended on 22 May 2011. Olimpi Rustavi are the defending champions, having won their second Georgian championship last season. FC Zestafoni claimed their first title.

The league size was expanded from 10 teams in that season to 12 teams in following season. Therefore, there was no direct relegation to the Pirveli Liga in that season.

Teams
Lokomotivi Tbilisi and Gagra were relegated to Pirveli Liga at the end of last season after finishing in 9th and 10th place respectively.

Promoted to Georgia's top football division were Pirveli Liga champions Torpedo 2008 Kutaisi and runners-up Kolkheti Poti.

Spartaki Tskhinvali play their home matches in Gori due to various inner-Georgian conflicts.
FC WIT Georgia play their home matches from this season on in the newly built WIT Georgia Stadium in the city of Mtskheta

League table

Results
The ten teams played each other four times in this league for a total of 36 matches per team. In the first half of the season each team played every other team twice (home and away) and then did the same in the second half of the season.

First half of season

Second half of season

Relegation play-offs
Due to the expansion of the league for next season, the 9th and 10th-place finishers of this competition (Spartaki Tskhinvali and Samtredia, respectively) will play single matches against the 3rd and 4th-place finishers of this season's Pirveli Liga competition (Dila Gori and Chikhura Sachkhere, respectively). The winners of these two matches will participate in this competition next season.

Top goalscorers
Including matches played on 1 May 2011

See also
 2010–11 Pirveli Liga
 2010–11 Georgian Cup

References

External links
 Georgian Football Federation 
 Georgian Professional Football League 

Erovnuli Liga seasons
1
Georgia